Charles Wyndham Watson (August 30, 1915 in Guelph, Ontario, Canada – April 20, 2002 in Kaneohe, Hawaii), was an American sculptor.  After working as an apprentice carpenter during the Great Depression, Watson studied engineering briefly at Santa Monica College.  He came to Hawaii after World War II as a manager for McNeil Construction. In 1950, he moved to Hawaiian Dredging Construction Company as a general superintendent and worked his way up to become president. His son Mark Watson is also a Hawaii-based sculptor.

His body of work included both figurative subjects and large abstract works, such as Tree in Foster Botanical Garden.  His sculptures in public places include:
 To the Nth Power, 1971, University of Hawaii at Manoa, Honolulu, Hawaii
 Pueo, 1980, Kaimuki High School, Honolulu, Hawaii
 Ka Mea Kui Upena, 1989, intersection of South King Street & Kapiolani Boulevard, Honolulu, Hawaii
 Giraffe (1959) and Ostrich (1960), Honolulu Zoo, Honolulu, Hawaii
 Hawaiian with O O, 1978, Hawaiian Dredging & Construction Company, 614 Kapahulu Avenue, Honolulu, Hawaii
 Mahiole (Feathered helmet), 1983, pair of stone sculptures, The Halekulani Hotel, Honolulu, Hawaii
 Tree, 1974, Foster Botanical Garden, Honolulu, Hawaii

References
 Charles W. Watson in the Art Inventories Catalog of the Smithsonian American Art Museum
 Hawaii Artreach, “Art in Public Places”, Vol. 15, Nos. 3 & 4, Winter 2001, p. 13.
 Radford, Georgia & Warren Radford, Sculpture in the Sun: Hawaii's Art for Open Spaces, Honolulu, University Press of Hawaii, 1978, pp. 58, 97.

Footnotes

Artists from Hawaii
Modern sculptors
1915 births
2002 deaths
20th-century American sculptors
20th-century American male artists
American male sculptors